Katherine Grace McNamara (born November 22, 1995) is an American actress, known for playing Clary Fray on the 2016–2019 supernatural drama television series Shadowhunters, and Mia Smoak in the superhero series Arrow. She has also starred as Julie Lawry in the post-apocalyptic miniseries The Stand. Her film roles include Lily Bowman in the 2011 romantic comedy New Year's Eve, Rosa in the 2015 drama A Sort of Homecoming, Sonya in the dystopian science fiction film series Maze Runner, and Amy in the 2021 thriller Trust. Since 2022, she stars in the western action series Walker: Independence as Abby Walker, which earned her a Critics Choice Super Award for Best Actress in an Action Series nomination. McNamara accolades includes, a Teen Choice Award and a People's Choice Award for her work on Shadowhunters.

Early life and education 
McNamara was born in Kansas City, Missouri, the only child of Ursula and Evan McNamara, who served in the U.S. military. She was raised in Lee's Summit, Missouri, and moved to Los Angeles, California in 2011.

While growing up, McNamara was an advanced student in certain subjects, resulting in her being partly homeschooled; she received her high school diploma at age 14. At age 17, McNamara graduated summa cum laude with a Bachelor of Science degree in Business Administration from Drexel University, completing much of her course work online. In July 2017, she said that she was enrolled in an online master's degree literature program at Johns Hopkins University.

Career

Acting 
McNamara began her acting career on stage in Kansas City. She then participated in motion picture productions filmed in the Kansas City area, such as Matchmaker Mary in 2008 and the short film "Get Off My Porch". In 2010, she appeared in the 2009 Broadway revival of A Little Night Music with Catherine Zeta-Jones and Angela Lansbury. She began making guest appearances in television series, including Law & Order: SVU, 30 Rock, and Drop Dead Diva. McNamara appeared in theatrical movies such as New Year's Eve and in the Disney Channel original movie Girl vs. Monster, playing the role of Myra Santelli. She co-starred in the film Tom Sawyer & Huckleberry Finn, playing the role of Tom's girlfriend Becky Thatcher. McNamara also appeared in the independent films Contest and A Sort of Homecoming.

She appeared on three episodes of the Disney XD series Kickin' It, in which she had a recurring role as Claire, Kim's rival, and in two episodes of the Disney Channel series Jessie, playing Bryn Brietbart, a rival to Emma Ross. She also appeared in an episode of the Nickelodeon series The Thundermans. McNamara was cast in the MTV series Happyland as Harper Munroe, a theme park photographer. It was announced that McNamara would playing the recurring role of Kat on the third season of The Fosters in 2015.

On May 6, 2015, ABC Family (now Freeform) announced that McNamara would be playing the lead character Clary Fray in Shadowhunters, a television adaptation of Cassandra Clare's bestselling book series The Mortal Instruments. McNamara appeared in The Maze Runner film sequel, Maze Runner: The Scorch Trials, as Sonya, a co-leader of Group B. She reprised the role in the 2018 sequel, Maze Runner: The Death Cure. 

In September 2018, McNamara was cast in the seventh season of Arrow as the recurring character of Mia Smoak, the daughter of Oliver Queen and Felicity Smoak; McNamara was later promoted to a series regular for Arrows eighth and final season. In October 2019, The CW announced plans for a potential Arrow spin-off featuring Mia Smoak. A backdoor pilot for the spin-off aired as the ninth episode of Arrow'''s final season. However, in January 2021, The CW passed on ordering the spin-off to series. In August 2021, The CW announced that McNamara would return as Mia Queen in the five-episode "Armageddon" storyline at the beginning of The Flash Season 8.

In October 2019, McNamara was cast as Julie Lawry in the CBS All Access limited series adaptation of Stephen King's The Stand. Principal photography on the limited series was completed in March 2020, and CBS All Access announced a premiere date of December 17, 2020.

In November 2018, McNamara joined the cast of a Charlie Day film, formerly known as El Tonto, and eventually retitled Fool's Paradise before a release in 2023. During May and June 2020, McNamara participated in the making of Untitled Horror Movie, a movie that was shot by cast members receiving direction from Nick Simon via remote videoconferencing. This was due to restrictions necessitated by COVID-19 distancing protocols. In 2021, QCode released The Burned Photo, a horror podcast, with McNamara as a member of the voice cast. The same year, she was also added to the voice cast of the animated film The Adventures of Bunny Bravo.

In March 2022, McNamara was cast in the lead role in the pilot to Walker: Independence, a planned prequel series to Walker. She portrays Abby Walker, the ancestor of Jared Padalecki's Cordell Walker. The same month, she was added to the cast of the film Jade, which is stuntman James Bamford's directorial debut. On April 11, 2022, began hosting a Shadowhunters rewatch podcast with co-star Dominic Sherwood called Return to the Shadows.

 Singing 
During the course of her career, McNamara has sung songs that were used in movies or television series in which she appeared. She wrote and sang "Chatter" for Contest, and she also appeared in a music video for that song. She wrote "My Heart Can Fly", which her character sings during a talent competition in Little Savages. She sang "Wait for You", the end credits song for A Sort of Homecoming. She also sang "Stay True", the end credits song for R.L. Stine's Monsterville: Cabinet of Souls. Her song "Ember" was played during the 20th episode of the second season of Shadowhunters.

In December 2019, McNamara was featured as the voice of singer Sally Jessup in the animated Christmas special episode of the Dreamworks series Spirit Riding Free entitled "Spirit of Christmas", which premiered on Netflix. She also provided the vocals for several songs featured in the special.

In November 2020, McNamara released "What Do We Got to Lose" on digital music platforms. Her song "Making a Monster Out of Me" became available on digital music platforms on December 17, 2020. She released "Love Me Like That" across various digital music platforms on February 14, 2021. All of these songs were recorded several years earlier, when McNamara was building a music portfolio.

 Philanthropy 
McNamara has participated in anti-bullying efforts by describing how she was bullied as a child. McNamara has also worked with the Lollipop Theater Network, visiting children who are confined to hospitals due to the severity of their illnesses. In 2017, she recorded the song "Glass Slipper", which was used as part of a charity campaign for the United Nations Girl Up program. She also created a t-shirt with the "Glass Slipper" lyrics as part of this campaign. In 2018 and 2019, she participated in the Big Slick Celebrity Weekend, which raises donations for the Kansas City Children's Mercy Hospital.

On March 31, 2020, McNamara announced that she was working on a song originally recorded in 2014 called "Just Like James" which was released April 8 in the Google Play Store, Apple's iTunes store, and Spotify. Proceeds from the song were donated to the World Health Organization (WHO) for Covid-19 relief efforts. Google donated funds matching sales from the first 30 days.

On May 8, 2020, McNamara participated in a live-reading adaptation of Jane Austen's Pride & Prejudice'' with Acting for a Cause.

Filmography

Film

Television

Web

Awards and nominations

References

External links 
 
 
 
 

1995 births
21st-century American actresses
Actresses from Kansas City, Missouri
American child actresses
American film actresses
American television actresses
American voice actresses
Drexel University alumni
Living people